The Summer of Flying Fish is a Chilean-French film directed by Marcela Said.

The film premiered in the Directors' Fortnight at the 2013 Cannes Film Festival. Starring Gregory Cohen, Francisca Walker, María Izquierdo, Roberto Cayuqueo and Bastián Bodenhöfer.

Plot
Manena is on vacation in the south of Chile with her father Francisco, a capitalist landowner and wildlife hunter. Francisco is obsessed with eliminating the carp fish in his aquaculture, resorting to increasingly extreme methods such as using explosives. Manena seems to be the only one who perceives the growing tension her father’s actions provoke in the local Mapuche community, who claim access to these lands.

Brief Review

The Chilean female director, Marcela Said, very delicately handles the theme of the storyline based on the long-standing conflict between the native Mapuche and the white land owners of European descent, and very skillfully depicts the drama and emotion in the film in a lifelike reality, which is further complemented by her choice of actors who have no experience in film acting. The overall effect of the film is a blend of both fiction and non-fiction. Apart from making an effort to give the story a graphic touch, the director appears to have tried bringing to light the gross injustice meted out by the rich white settlers to the native South American Mapuche tribesmen.

The film based on a socio-political theme may draw a distinctive section of the cinema crowd but not much on the commercial market.

The debut directorial venture of ex-documentary director, however, has had some critical reviews too on the media coverage following the 2013 Cannes Film Festival. Although very successful in building up on-the-edge-of-your-seat sequences, the movie suffers from poor narrative, shallow characterization and vague motivation.

Cast
 Gregory Cohen – Francisco
 Francisca Walker – Manena
 María Izquierdo – Teresa
 Roberto Cayuqueo – Pedro
 Bastián Bodenhöfer – Carlos
 Guillermo Lorca – Lorca
 Paola Lattus – Ester
 Emilia Lara – Isidora
 Enrique Soto – Nacho

See also 
 Cinema of Chile

References

External links

2013 films
2010s Spanish-language films
Chilean comedy-drama films
French comedy-drama films
2010s French films